Orangevale is a census-designated place (CDP) in Sacramento County, California, United States. It is part of the Sacramento–Arden-Arcade–Roseville Metropolitan Statistical Area. The population was 33,960 at the 2010 census, up from 26,705 at the 2000 census. The community is known for its rolling hills that offer the best views of the Sierra Nevada mountain range, its foothills, and a rural environment in the middle of a growing metropolitan area. Some residential properties in the area are zoned to accommodate horses and orchards. It has a ZIP Code of 95662.

Geography
Orangevale is located at  (38.681903, -121.213824).

Orangevale is primarily rolling hills near the base of the Sierra Nevada Foothills.

Demographics

2010
The 2010 United States Census reported that Orangevale had a population of 33,960. The racial makeup of Orangevale was 27,881 (80.9%) White, 543 (0.1%) African American, 848 (2.5%) Asian, 924 (2.7%) from Two or More Races, 309 (0.9%) Native American, 91 (0.3%) Native Hawaiian or Other Pacific Islander, and 3,324 (9.6%) Hispanic or Latino.

The Census reported that 33,742 people (99.4% of the population) lived in households, 115 (0.3%) lived in non-institutionalized group quarters, and 103 (0.3%) were institutionalized.

There were 12,816 households, out of which 4,277 (33.4%) had children under the age of 18 living in them, 6,900 (53.8%) were opposite-sex married couples living together, 1,473 (11.5%) had a female householder with no husband present, 717 (5.6%) had a male householder with no wife present.  There were 761 (5.9%) unmarried opposite-sex partnerships, and 80 (0.6%) same-sex married couples or partnerships. 2,832 households (22.1%) were made up of individuals, and 1,094 (8.5%) had someone living alone who was 65 years of age or older. The average household size was 2.63.  There were 9,090 families (70.9% of all households); the average family size was 3.07.

The population was spread out, with 7,785 people (22.9%) under the age of 18, 2,877 people (8.5%) aged 18 to 24, 8,296 people (24.4%) aged 25 to 44, 10,479 people (30.9%) aged 45 to 64, and 4,523 people (13.3%) who were 65 years of age or older.  The median age was 40.7 years. For every 100 females, there were 97.4 males.  For every 100 females age 18 and over, there were 94.5 males.

The homeowner vacancy rate was 1.8%; the rental vacancy rate was 7.9%.  25,032 people (73.7% of the population) lived in owner-occupied housing units and 8,710 people (25.6%) lived in rental housing units.

2000
As of the census of 2000, there were 26,705 people, 9,856 households, and 7,116 families residing in the CDP. The racial makeup of the CDP was 89.52% White, 1.13% African American, 1.04% Native American, 2.46% Asian, 0.19% Pacific Islander, 1.69% from other races, and 3.99% from two or more races. Hispanic or Latino of any race were 6.80% of the population.

There were 9,856 households, out of which 34.6% had children under the age of 18 living with them, 55.3% were married couples living together, 11.5% had a female householder with no husband present, and 27.8% were non-families. 21.0% of all households were made up of individuals, and 7.1% had someone living alone who was 65 years of age or older.  The average household size was 2.67 and the average family size was 3.09.

In the CDP, the population was spread out, with 26.6% under the age of 18, 8.1% from 18 to 24, 29.1% from 25 to 44, 24.4% from 45 to 64, and 11.8% who were 65 years of age or older.  The median age was 37 years. For every 100 females, there were 97.7 males.  For every 100 females age 18 and over, there were 95.0 males.

The median income for a household in the CDP was $53,371, and the median income for a family was $60,822. Males had a median income of $43,712 versus $31,510 for females. The per capita income for the CDP was $24,658.  About 5.1% of families and 6.9% of the population were below the poverty line, including 7.5% of those under age 18 and 4.0% of those age 65 or over.

Politics
In the state legislature, Orangevale is in the 1st Senate District, represented by Republican Brian Dahle, and is in California's 6th Assembly District, represented by Republican Kevin Kiley.

History
Originally Orange Vale Colony, the community began as part of the 1844 Rancho San Juan Mexican land grant. The area was rural and home to numerous orange groves. Oak trees (remnants of which can be seen in the Orangevale Park) were common, as were trails made by Maidu Native Americans many years before. In addition to orange groves, several olive orchards were also once in the area, and some original trees can still be found along Chestnut, Orangevale, Main, and Walnut Avenues.

Education

Public schools in Orangevale are under the jurisdiction of the San Juan Unified School District.
Elementary schools include Trajan Fundamental Elementary, Green Oaks Fundamental Elementary, Oakview Elementary, Pershing Elementary, Twin Lakes Elementary, and Ottomon Elementary. Orangevale is served by two junior highs;  Louis Pasteur and Andrew Carnegie. Casa Roble Fundamental High School is the primary high school for the area, with some southern Orangevale residents attending Bella Vista in nearby Fair Oaks.

Transportation
Orangevale can be reached from the following freeway exits:

Interstate 80: Greenback Lane (Exit 98, 6 miles east of the exit), Sierra College Boulevard (Exit 109, 9 miles south of the exit)

U.S. Route 50:  Hazel Avenue (Exit 21, 3 miles north of the exit)

Public transportation is provided by the Sacramento Regional Transit. One local route (Route 24) is available Mondays to Fridays from Sunrise Mall in Citrus Heights.  One express bus (Route 109) is available only Mondays to Fridays travels directly to Downtown Sacramento via U.S. Route 50. These routes follow the commute direction to Sacramento in the morning, and vice versa in the afternoon. The closest light rail stations are the Historic Folsom station (3 miles) and Hazel station (4 miles).

In addition, Folsom Stage Lines of Folsom takes passengers from the Sacramento Regional Transit's Historic Folsom light rail station to a bus stop that serves Route 24 of Sacramento Regional Transit.

Notable people
 Ryan Cordell, baseball player in the Texas Rangers organization.
 Devin Dawson, singer
 Steve Lamson, former professional motocross racer and AMA motocross national champion (1995, 1996)
 Eric Stuteville, basketball player
 Mary Whipple, coxswain for the U.S. women's rowing team.  She and her team won gold at the 2008 Summer Olympics and silver at the 2004 Summer Olympics.
Theresa Knorr, convicted murderer
Ryann Redman, wardrobe stylist

Adjacent areas

External links
The Community of Orangevale, CA
Orangevale Chamber of Commerce

References

Census-designated places in Sacramento County, California
Census-designated places in California